Barnes Murphy  (born in Sligo, Ireland), is a former Gaelic footballer who represented the Sligo county team during the 1970s and 1980s. Aside from winning a GAA All Stars Award in 1974, he won a Connacht Senior Football Championship medal with Sligo in 1975 when he both captained and coached Sligo the same year. Murphy played football for Connacht many times in his career and his talent was duly recognized by the Connacht Railway Cup management in 1976 when he was selected as the first and only Sligo man to captain his province.

Murphy also enjoyed success at club level, winning five county championships (with Craomh Rua and St Mary's), five League medals (also with Craomh Rua and St Mary's), three Connacht club championships and, an All-Ireland 7s. He also won Junior titles with St John's after the new club was formed when the old Sligo borough boundaries were further divided. To date, Murphy along with Mickey Kearins are Sligo's most decorated and successful footballers ever.

Murphy lives in his native Sligo where he is still involved in club football. Barnes is featured in The Best of the West: GAA Greats of Connacht, a book by John Scally that features GAA's best players from the west of Ireland. Mickey Kearins & Eamon O'Hara are also featured.

References

External links

http://www.hoganstand.com/Sligo/ArticleForm.aspx?ID=26256
http://www.sligogaa.ie/ArticleDetail.aspx?articleid=4575
https://web.archive.org/web/20080513155323/http://www.westsligo.com/castleconnor/sport.htm
https://web.archive.org/web/20091001055714/http://www.castleconnor.sligo.gaa.ie/photogallery.html
http://www.vodafone.ie/download?id=FOOTBALLALLSTARS
https://web.archive.org/web/20090804175030/http://www.gaa.ulsterbank.com/teamprofiles.html/sligo
https://web.archive.org/web/20110629103633/http://archives.tcm.ie/sligoweekender/2002/07/11/story8501.asp
http://homepage.eircom.net/~stokanens/
https://web.archive.org/web/20090915174003/http://www.rte.ie/sport/gaa/2007/0708/sligo.html
http://www.irishtimes.com/newspaper/sport/2007/0804/1186123301689.html
http://www.independent.ie/sport/gaa-championships/orsquohara-keeps-on-reaching-for-stars-1791596.html
 https://web.archive.org/web/20110107054522/http://roscommonhistory.ie/Misc/Arts/Literature/scally.htm

1947 births
Living people
Sligo inter-county Gaelic footballers
St Mary's (Sligo) Gaelic footballers